The Central Services Agency (CSA) was established in 1973 and was responsible for providing support services to various health and social work agencies in Northern Ireland.

Functions
The CSA had eight core functions:
 Counter Fraud Unit
 Equality Unit
 Family Practitioner Services
 Finance
 Human Resources
 Legal Services
 Regional Supplies Service
 Research and Development

Transfer
On 1 April 2009 most of the CSA's responsibilities were transferred to the newly created Health & Social Care Business Services Organisation.

External links
 Legacy website

Health and Social Care (Northern Ireland)